Albert Casper Schweitzer (December 23, 1882 – January 27, 1969) was an outfielder in Major League Baseball. Nicknamed "Cheese", he played for the St. Louis Browns.

References

External links

1882 births
1969 deaths
Major League Baseball outfielders
St. Louis Browns players
Baseball players from Cleveland
Newark Cotton Tops players
New Castle Nocks players
Memphis Chickasaws players
Richmond Colts players
Sacramento Wolves players
Mission Wolves players
Topeka Savages players
Rochester Hustlers players
Toledo Iron Men players
Wilson Bugs players
Rock Island Islanders players
Petersburg Trunkmakers players